The desert long-eared bat (Otonycteris hemprichii) is a species of vesper bat found in North Africa and the Middle East.

Taxonomy
The taxonomic classification of Otonycteris is unclear, however their chromosomes suggest that this genus is closely related to the Barbastella and Plecotus genera.

Description
Male desert long-eared bats weigh . They have nearly horizontally directed ears, which use a band of skin to connect across the forehead and are about 40 mm in length. The desert long-eared bat has a pale sandy and dark brown upper part, with a whitish bottom. It has a similar skull and similar teeth to the Eptesicus. Some specimens of this species have two sets of mammae in their pectoral muscles, which is unique for mammals. These mammae may not be functional.

Ecology and behavior
This species normally inhabits dry, arid, rocky, and barren regions. One pair of these bats was found living in a hill's crevice in the Negev Desert. This bat has also been found in buildings. 

Otonycteris hemprichii has a flight pattern described as "floppy and slow".

Diet
This species is assumed to be carnivorous due to its body mass, low wing loading, and low aspect ratio. This bat likely forages close to the ground, using echolocation to detect large flying or surface-dwelling invertebrates. Through echolocation, the bats can detect scorpions as they walk. They feed mostly on arachnids and orthopterans that are seized directly from the ground. An Israeli study found that up to 70% of the bat droppings contained scorpion fragments, including the highly venomous Palestine yellow scorpion along with other less venomous species. The bat catches the scorpion, biting its head off. The bats are often stung in the face with the scorpion’s stinger with no recorded signs of toxicity, suggesting that the bats are immune to the venom.

Courtship and breeding

Breeding colonies consisting of 3–15 females have been discovered. Seven pregnant females, most with two embryos, were found in central Asia. In a deserted hut in Jordan three pregnant females, all of whom carried two embryos were found.

Distribution and range
Its range is now recognized to include Afghanistan, Algeria, Egypt, India, Iran, Israel, Jordan, Kazakhstan, Libya, Morocco, Niger, Oman, Pakistan, Qatar, Saudi Arabia, Sudan,Syrian Arab Republic, Tajikistan, Tunisia, Turkey, Turkmenistan, United Arab Emirates, and Uzbekistan.

References

Otonycteris
Bats of Africa
Bats of the Arabian Peninsula
Bats of India
Mammals of North Africa
Mammals of the Middle East
Mammals of Western Asia
Mammals of Pakistan
Mammals of Central Asia
Mammals of West Africa
Fauna of the Sahara
Fauna of Egypt
Vertebrates of Israel
Negev
Taxonomy articles created by Polbot
Mammals described in 1859
Taxa named by Wilhelm Peters